212 was a kind of soviet cruise missile developed in 1936 by Sergei Korolev. It was tested twice before being cancelled in 1939.

The design was completed on August 2, 1936, and consisted of a rocket with wings which launched from a catapult. The catapult was tested twice in November, 1936, using a mock-up of the missile; both tests failed. It was then decided to use a Tupolev TB-3 aircraft as launch platform. The first test was done on May 27, 1938. Korolev was arrested one month later, but the project continued without him. On January 10, 1938, it was decided to no longer use Valentin Glushko's ORM-65 rocket engine due to problems with the control system and some explosions. At that time the name of the missile was changed to 803. During 1939 there were two more tests, failing again due to the control system. The project was finally abandoned.

References 

212
1936 in Russia